Thaddeus Grauer (died after 1945) was an Austrian art dealer implicated in the trade in looted art from the Second World War but whose loyalties and activities are uncertain.

Second World War era
Around the time of the start of the Second World War, Grauer moved to Switzerland. In 1945 he told the British Consulate-General in Sao Paulo that this was to avoid Nazi persecution. In 1941, he moved again, to Brazil where he was resident at Rua Alagoas 664, Sao Paulo. He left his personal effects with the auctioneer Theodor Fischer in Switzerland with the exception of pictures that he instructed were to be shipped to Brazil.

Recently declassified American official records note a 1942 letter from Grauer to M.P. Brandeis in New York suggesting that Brandeis organise an exhibition of anti-Nazi propaganda in New York. Grauer informed Brandeis in the letter that he was managing an estate 800 kilomoteres north of Sao Paulo in a region that had been infiltrated by many Japanese.

Looted art
In 1998, more than 24 paintings looted from European Jews were discovered in a Sao Paulo art gallery that were traced to Grauer and before that Theodor Fischer. Fischer had been an important figure in the trading of art looted by the Nazis during the Second World War. The paintings included a Picasso and a Monet.

References

External links
http://www.fold3.com/image/270080827/

Austrian art dealers
Year of birth missing
Year of death missing